Blood Brothers: The 1995 London Cast Recording is a studio album featuring the score of the musical Blood Brothers by Willy Russell.

Background
A recording of the original London production of the show was released in 1983, featuring Barbara Dickson in the lead role of Mrs Johnstone. After touring the UK, the producer Bill Kenwright opened another production in London at the Albery Theatre in 1988. An album featuring that cast, including Kiki Dee as Mrs Johnstone, was released the same year. The production moved to the Phoenix Theatre in 1991, where it continued to run until 2012. The cast of that production was recorded in 1995.

Production
The album was recorded at Air Studios Lyndhurst Hall, Redan Recorders, Maison Rouge and Matrix Studio. It was mixed at Air Studios Lyndhurst Hall.

Track listing
All tracks are written by Willy Russell.
 Overture
 Marilyn Monroe
 My Child
 Easy Terms
 Shoes Upon the Table
 July 18
 Kids' Game
 Gypsies in the Wood
 Long Sunday Afternoon/My Friend
 Bright New Day
 Entr'acte/Marilyn Monroe 2
 Secrets
 That Guy
 Summer Sequence
 I'm Not Saying a Word
 One Day in October
 Take a Letter Miss Jones
 The Robbery
 Marilyn Monroe 3
 Light Romance/Madman
 The Council Chamber
 Tell Me It's Not True

Personnel

Performers
 Stephanie Lawrence - Mrs Johnstone
 Paul Crosby - Mickey
 Mark Hutchinson - Eddie
 Warwick Evans - Narrator
 Joanna Monro - Mrs Lyons
 David Hitchen - Mr Lyons
 Joe Young - Sammy
 Jacintha Whyte and Sarah Rimmer - Linda
 Annie Muscroft - Donna Marie, Mrs Johnston, Ensemble
 Peter Faulkner - Policeman, Cowboy, Ensemble
 David Bingham - Perkins, Neighbour, Ensemble
 Alex Harland - Postman, Ensemble
 Jeremy Backhouse - Ensemble
 Jean Carter - Ensemble
 Keith Murphy - Ensemble

Musicians
 Rod Edwards - Musical Director, keyboards
 Will Hill - drums
 Bernard Reilly - percussion
 Terry Johnston - guitars
 Nick Payn - saxophones
 Martin Etheridge - trumpet, flugel
 Susanna Furmanek-Halberda - violin

Production credits
 Jon Miller - producer
 Bill Kenwright - executive producer
 Rod Edwards - arranger
 Del Newman - arranger
 Steve Orchard - remix engineer
 Ben Georgiades - assistant engineer
 Roger T. Wake - mastering engineer
 John Craig - coordinator for First Night Records

Certifications

References

1995 albums
Cast recordings